ABCs of Death 2 is a 2014 American comedy horror anthology film produced by Ant Timpson and Tim League. It contains 26 different shorts, each by different directors spanning various countries. It is a sequel to The ABCs of Death (2012), and second installment in the ABCs of Death film series. Directors featured include Jim Hosking, Lancelot Oduwa Imasuen, the Soska sisters, Julian Barrett, Rodney Ascher, Kristina Buožytė, Larry Fessenden, Navot Papushado, Aharon Keshales, Bill Plympton, and Vincenzo Natali.

The film received a much more positive response than its predecessor. A second sequel titled ABCs of Death 3: Teach Harder was announced to be in development during the post-credits title card. However, due to illegal pirating of the second movie, the status of the project has been left in development Hell. Despite this, producers released what they categorized as a spin-off, titled ABC's of Death 2  in 2016.

Plot
Like the first film, the sequel is divided into 26 individual chapters, each helmed by a different director assigned a letter of the alphabet. The directors were then given free rein in choosing a word to create a story involving death. The varieties of death range from accidents to murders.

A contest was held for the role of the 26th director. The winner was music video director Robert Boocheck, who submitted his short for M.

Content
The movie begins with a creepy stop-motion storybook that opens showing children doing a variety of fun activities that end up being very deadly (i.e. a jump rope slices a girl in half, children playing ball with a boy's head and a girl on a swing made from a boy's intestines). Throughout the film, a teacher with a skeleton face presents the titles to all the segments, with each of the segments ending and beginning with a focus on, or a fade into, the color black.

In a post-credits scene a man (Laurence R. Harvey) is seen masturbating to T is for Torture Porn, but stops after being put off by the content.

Reception

The review aggregator website Rotten Tomatoes reported a 77% approval rating based on 31 reviews, with an average rating of 6.2/10. The website's critical consensus reads, "ABCs of Death 2 delivers some inventively gory thrills, offering a surprising (albeit still somewhat uneven) upgrade over its predecessor". Metacritic, which uses a weighted average, assigned a score of 53 out of 100 based on ten critics, indicating "mixed or average reviews".

References

External links
 
 
 
 
 
 

2014 films
2014 black comedy films
2014 comedy horror films
2014 independent films
2014 LGBT-related films
American black comedy films
American comedy horror films
American horror anthology films
American independent films
American sequel films
American splatter films
American supernatural horror films
Films based on urban legends
Films directed by Bill Plympton
Films directed by Julian Gilbey
Films directed by Julien Maury and Alexandre Bustillo
Films directed by Vincenzo Natali
Films directed by the Soska sisters
Films with screenplays by Vincenzo Natali
LGBT-related horror films
2010s English-language films
2010s American films